

First-generation biofuels
First-generation biofuels use the edible parts of food plants as their carbon source feedstock. Due to this, the production of fuel from these crops effectively creates problems in regard to the global food production.

 ADM Ölmühle Hamburg, part of Archer Daniels Midland; Germany
 Products: biodiesel
 Diester Industrie, part of Bunge Limited; France
 Products: biodiesel
 Jilin Fuel Ethanol, part of China National Petroleum Corporation; China
 LS9, Inc, South San Francisco, California and Okeechobee, Florida, United States
 Technology: fermenters with genetically modified bacteria
 Feedstocks: sugar cane syrup; planned: cellulose agricultural residues
 Products: fuel oils, chemicals

Second-generation biofuels
Second-generation biofuels use non-food substances as a feedstock carbon source. Examples include non-food plants, the inedible parts of food plants, and waste cooking fat. Unlike first-generation biofuels, they do not create problems in regard to the global food production.

 Biofuel Research Team (BRTeam), Iran
 BRTeam is a multinational research team (Iran, Malaysia, Sweden, US, Belgium, UK), focused on various aspects of biofuel research, in particular, advanced reactor technologies.
 Blue Marble Energy, Seattle, Washington, United States
 Technology: consortia of different non-GM bacteria
 Feedstocks: "nearly any organic biomass"
 Products: methane, nitrogen compounds, hydrogen
 Chemrec, Stockholm, Sweden
 Technology: black liquor gasification
 Feedstocks: black liquor from sulfate process or sulfite process pulp mills
 Products: biomethanol, BioDME
 DuPont Danisco, Vonore, Tennessee, United States
 Feedstocks: non-edible parts of plants
 Products: ethanol
 Evoleum, St-Jean-sur-Richelieu, Quebec, Canada
 Feedstocks: recycled vegetable oil
 Products: biodiesel and biobunker
 Fujian Zhongde, part of China Clean Energy; Fuqing, Fujian, China
 Feedstocks: waste vegetable oils
 Products: biodiesel, chemicals
 Green BioFuels Corporation, Miami, Florida, United States
 Inbicon Americas, Conversion of Agricultural Residues such as wheat straw, corn stover and sugar bagasse, USA
 Feedstocks: vegetable oil, animal fat, recycled cooking oil
 Products: biodiesel, glycerol
 Gushan Environmental Energy, Beijing, Shanghai, Mianyang, Sichuan, Handan, Hebei, Fuzhou, and Fujian, China
 Feedstocks: vegetable oil, animal fat, recycled cooking oil
 Products: biodiesel, glycerol, plant asphalt, erucic acid, erucic amide
 Targray, Kirkland, Quebec, Canada
 Feedstocks: recycled cooking oil, Midwest soy beans, North American canola, corn oil, mixed tallow
 Products: biodiesel

Second-generation biofuels with additional advantages

Algae and cyanobacteria fuels
The so-called "third-generation biofuels", similar to second-generation biofuels with an emphasize on the use of algae and cyanobacteria as a source of biofuel feedstocks, have an additional advantage as they take up a relatively small fraction of space when compared to first and second-generation biofuel sources, and may also help to reduce seawater eutrophication. They use algae to convert carbon dioxide into biomass.

 Algae Cluster, Europe
 Algenol, Bonita Springs, Florida; Baltimore; and Lee County, Florida, United States
 Technology: algae grown in photobioreactors
 Feedstocks: seawater, sunlight, carbon dioxide
 Products: ethanol, freshwater
 Gevo, Douglas County, Colorado, United States
 Global Green Algae, part of Global Green Solutions. El Paso, Texas, United States
 GreenFuel Technologies Corporation, Cambridge, Massachusetts, United States, ceased operations in 2009
 Joule Unlimited, Cambridge, Massachusetts, United States
 Feedstocks: water, sunlight, carbon dioxide
 Technology: modified cyanobacteria and bioreactors
 Products: diesel fuel
 PetroSun, Scottsdale, Arizona, United States
 Technology: pyrolysis of organics, algae
 Products: algal oil, hydrogen, charcoal fertilizer
 PowerFuel.de, Kaufbeuren, Swabia, Bavaria, Germany
 Technology: hyper-ionizing
 Feedstocks: UCO, CPO (used palm oil)
 Products: oils, including ship and truck fuels
 Sapphire Energy, San Diego, California, United States
 Technology: algae
 Feedstocks: sunlight, carbon dioxide
 Products: green crude
 Solazyme, South San Francisco, California, United States
 Technology: algae
 Feedstocks: plant matter
 Products: oils, including aviation fuel
 Aurora Biofuels
 OriginOil
 PetroAlgae
 Solix
 Synthetic Genomics

Fourth-generation biofuels
Some fourth-generation technology pathways include pyrolysis, gasification, upgrading, solar-to-fuel, and genetic manipulation of organisms to secrete hydrocarbons.

 GreenFuel Technologies Corporation Cambridge, Massachusetts
 Technology: developed a patented bioreactor system that uses nontoxic photosynthetic algae to take in smokestacks' flue gases and produce biofuels such as biodiesel, biogas and a dry fuel comparable to coal

Hydrocarbon plants or petroleum plants are plants which produce terpenoids as secondary metabolites that can be converted to gasoline-like fuels. Latex-producing members of the Euphorbiaceae such as Euphorbia lathyris and E. tirucalli and members of Apocynaceae have been studied for their potential energy uses.

Some other companies making 4th generation biofuels are:
 Algenol
 Amyris Biotechnologies
 Joule Unlimited
 LS9
 Naturally Scientific

Fifth-generation biofuels 
In July 2022, a Research Association of Biomass Innovation for Next Generation Automobile Fuels was established by six Japanese automotive companies.

References

See also
 Biofuel
 Biofuels by region
 List of algal fuel producers
 Renewable energy

Biodiesel producers
Biofuels